SM City Pampanga is a shopping mall owned and operated by SM Prime Holdings. It is located along the Jose Abad Santos Avenue (formerly Olongapo-Gapan Road) in San Fernando and Mexico in the province of Pampanga. It is the first SM Supermall in Central Luzon and is currently the second largest shopping mall in the Northern and Central Luzon. The shopping mall is composed of the Main Building, Annex 1, Annex 2 and Annex 3.

Location
SM City Pampanga is located along Jose Abad Santos Avenue (formerly Olongapo-Gapan Road), corner North Luzon Expressway, Barangay San Jose, City of San Fernando, and Barangay Lagundi, Mexico. The mall's east wing (Building 4) is located along the Jose Abad Santos Avenue, Barangay Lagundi, Mexico, Pampanga. On the rest of the mall complex, (Annex 1, Main Mall and Annex 2) is located on the same road but this time part of the City of San Fernando. The mall is adjacent to both the San Fernando Exit of the North Luzon Expressway and to the Robinsons Starmills Pampanga.

Physical Details
The mall opened in November 2000. An annex (building 2) was added in October 2002. Annex 3 (building 3), added 99,439 square meters to the mall's gross floor area. The newest annex (Building 4) opened in October 2007 with an additional 16,700 square meters of floor area.

Features

Sky Ranch

Sky Ranch Pampanga opened on November 30, 2014 and it is the second branch of the said amusement park after its first branch in Tagaytay.

Drive-in cinema
Upon the closure of cinemas since March 2020 amidst the COVID-19 pandemic in the Philippines, SM Cinema opened up a drive-in-cinema dubbed as SM Cinema: Movies at Sundown on July 31, 2020 located at the mall's amphitheater, with the ticket prices starting at 400 pesos, and must be purchased through SM Tickets website. The first film to be shown in this drive-in-cinema is the biggest South Korean horror film, Train to Busan 2: Peninsula.

Incident
On September 20, 2011, before noontime, Two minors, both male, were critically injured in a shooting incident.
On April 22, 2019, an earthquake almost made one of the logos fall down.

References

Shopping malls in Pampanga
Shopping malls established in 2000
SM Prime
Buildings and structures in San Fernando, Pampanga